Offcell is an EP released by indie rock band Pinback.

Track listing
 "Microtonic Wave" - 4:58
 "Victorius D" - 4:17
 "Offcell" - 4:31
 "B" - 4:51
 "Grey Machine" - 11:08

References

Pinback albums
2003 EPs